Chitra Deb (24 November 1943 — 2 October 2017) was a Bengali novelist and editor.

Early life
Deb was born in 1943 in Purnea, British India. She completed her M.A and Ph.D. in Bengali Literature from Calcutta University.

Literary career
Smt. Deb started her career in Anandabazar Patrika and worked there since 1980 to 2004. She was the in charge of library section of the ABP. Deb has edited and translated a number of books and also has a few historical novels for children to her credit. She has researched and written extensively on the contribution of women in the social and cultural history of Bengal. Deb's most popular work related with Women of The Tagore Household. Her book Thakurbarir Andarmahal was published in 1980 which was awarded by Bangla Academy and translated into many languages. She also received 'Chittaranjan Bandopadhyay birth centenary award' by Bangiya Sahitya Parisad. Her books are namely:
 Thakurbarir Andarmahal
 Thakurbarir Bahirmahal
 Bibahobasorer Kabyokatha
 Antopurer Atmokotha
 Mahila Daktar
 Vingraher Basinda
 Apon Kheyale Cholen Raja
 Rupobotir Mala
 Bharater Rani
 Buddhodeb Keman Dekhte Chilen
 Advut Jato Hatir Galpo
 Siddhidatar Antordhan

Death
Deb was suffered in Myasthenia gravis disease. She died on 2 October 2017 in Kolkata.

References

1943 births
2017 deaths
Writers from Kolkata
Bengali Hindus
Bengali writers
Bengali-language writers
Women writers from West Bengal
20th-century Indian women writers
Indian women novelists
Novelists from West Bengal
20th-century Indian biographers
Indian women non-fiction writers
Women biographers
University of Calcutta alumni